The Monti government was the sixty-first government of Italy and was announced on 16 November 2011. This Experts' cabinet was composed of independents, three of whom were women and was formed as an interim government. The government ran the country for eighteen months until the aftermath of the elections in Spring 2013 and then replaced by the Letta government, formed by Enrico Letta on 28 April.

Formation

On 9 November 2011, Monti was appointed a senator for life by Italian President Giorgio Napolitano. He was seen as a favourite to replace Silvio Berlusconi and lead a new unity government in Italy in order to implement reforms and austerity measures. The ultimate purpose of Monti's appointment was to save Italy from the eurozone sovereign debt crisis.

On 12 November 2011, following Berlusconi's resignation, Napolitano asked Monti to form a new government. Monti accepted, and held talks with the leaders of the main Italian political parties, declaring that he wanted to form a government that would remain in office until the next scheduled general elections in 2013. On 16 November 2011, Monti was sworn in as Prime Minister of Italy, after making known a technocratic government composed entirely of unelected professionals. He also chose to hold personally the post of Minister of Economy and Finance. His tenure in the latter post lasted until 11 July 2012 when Vittorio Grilli, previously vice-minister, became Minister.

On 17 and 18 November 2011, the Italian Senate and Italian Chamber of Deputies both passed motions of confidence supporting Monti's government, with only the Northern League voting against.

Investiture votes

Composition

Notable actions
On 9 October 2012, Interior Minister Anna Maria Cancellieri sacked the municipal administration of Reggio Calabria (mayor, assessors, councillors) for alleged links to the organised crime syndicate 'Ndrangheta after a months long investigation and replaced it with three central government appointed administrators to govern for 18 months until a new election in 2014. This was the first time the government of a provincial capital had been dismissed.

References

See also
 Government of Experts

2011 establishments in Italy
2013 disestablishments in Italy
Italian governments
Cabinets established in 2011
Cabinets disestablished in 2013